Lior Jean (born August 20, 1986) is an Israeli footballer. At international level, Jan was capped at levels from under-17 to under-21.

Honours
Toto Cup:
2008–09
Liga Leumit
2013-14

References

1986 births
Living people
Israeli Jews
Israeli footballers
Association football defenders
Maccabi Tel Aviv F.C. players
Hapoel Be'er Sheva F.C. players
Hapoel Haifa F.C. players
Hapoel Petah Tikva F.C. players
Maccabi Netanya F.C. players
Maccabi Yavne F.C. players
Hapoel Herzliya F.C. players
Hapoel Ironi Baqa al-Gharbiyye F.C. players
Hapoel Kiryat Ono F.C. players
Association football utility players
Israeli Premier League players
Liga Leumit players
Israel under-21 international footballers
Footballers from Tel Aviv
Israeli people of Libyan-Jewish descent